Jamal Zougam ( 5 October 1973) is one of six men implicated in the 2004 Madrid train bombings. He was detained on 13 March 2004, accused of multiple counts of murder, attempted murder, stealing a vehicle, belonging to a terrorist organisation and four counts of carrying out terrorist acts. Spain's El País newspaper reported that three witnesses testified to seeing him leave a rucksack aboard one of the bombed trains, specifically, the one that exploded at Santa Eugenia station.

Born in Morocco, Zougam owned a mobile phone shop in the Lavapiés neighborhood in Madrid called Nuevo Siglo (The New Century). He is believed to be the person who sold telephones which were used to detonate the bombs in the attack. He also reportedly helped construct the bombs and was one of the first to be arrested.

Sentencing
On 31 October 2007, he was convicted of 191 charges of murder and 1,856 charges of attempted murder, and received a sentence of 42,922 years in confinement. A Spaniard, Emilio Suárez Trashorras, who supplied dynamite in return for drugs – was sentenced to 34,715 years.

References

External links
Madrid bombing suspects. BBC.
The Madrid Bombing. CBC.

1970s births
Living people
People from Tangier
Moroccan expatriates in Spain
People imprisoned on charges of terrorism
2004 Madrid train bombings
Prisoners sentenced to life imprisonment by Spain
Moroccan people convicted of murder
Moroccan people imprisoned abroad
Moroccan prisoners sentenced to life imprisonment
People convicted of murder by Spain
2004 murders in Spain
Male murderers